Vyacheslav Oliynyk (born April 27, 1966) is a former Ukrainian wrestler and Olympic champion. He won a gold medal at the 1996 Summer Olympics in Atlanta. He was born in Zhdanov, Ukrainian SSR, Soviet Union.

References

External links

1966 births
Living people
Wrestlers at the 1996 Summer Olympics
Wrestlers at the 2000 Summer Olympics
Soviet male sport wrestlers
Ukrainian male sport wrestlers
Olympic gold medalists for Ukraine
Olympic wrestlers of Ukraine
Olympic medalists in wrestling
Sportspeople from Mariupol
Medalists at the 1996 Summer Olympics
National University of Ukraine on Physical Education and Sport alumni
Chevaliers of the Order For Courage
20th-century Ukrainian people
21st-century Ukrainian people